Shadow Squad is a British TV series that ran from 1957-59 starring Peter Williams and George Moon. 179 episodes were made, of which only four survive. Network released the surviving episodes on DVD in 2011, along with the sole surviving episode of the spin-off, Skyport. Both series were produced by Granada Television.

Premise
Criminal cases investigated by the Shadow Squad detective agency run by former Scotland Yard sleuth Don Carter, along with his trusty Cockney sidekick Ginger Smart.

Main cast
George Moon as Ginger Smart  
Peter Williams as	Don Carter 
John Horsley as Supt. Whitelaw 
Rex Garner as Vic Steele
Kathleen Boutall as Mrs. Moggs

References

External links
Shadow Squad at IMDb

1957 British television series debuts
1959 British television series endings
English-language television shows
1950s British drama television series
Black-and-white British television shows
Lost television shows
Television shows produced by Granada Television
Detective television series